The Seventy-first Amendment of the Constitution of India, officially known as The Constitution (Seventy-first Amendment) Act, 1992, amended the Eighth Schedule to the Constitution so as to include Konkani, Meitei (officially called "Manipuri") and Nepali languages, thereby raising the total number of languages listed in the schedule to eighteen. The Eighth Schedule lists languages that the Government of India has the responsibility to develop.

The Eighth Schedule to the Constitution originally included 14 languages. Sindhi was included by the 21st Amendment, enacted in 1967. Bodo, Dogri, Santhali and Maithili were included in the Eighth Schedule in 2004, through the 92nd Amendment, raising the total number of languages to 22.

Text

Proposal and enactment
The Constitution (Seventy-first Amendment) Act, 1992, was introduced in Lok Sabha on 20 August 1992, as the Constitution (Seventy-eighth Amendment) Bill, 1992  (Bill No. 142 of 1992). It was introduced by Shankarrao Chavan, then Minister of Home Affairs, and sought to include Konkani, Meitei and Nepali languages in the Eighth Schedule of the Constitution. The full text of the Statement of Objects and Reasons appended to the bill is given below:

The Bill was debated by the Lok Sabha on 20 August 1992 and, as amended, passed on the same day. Clause 1 of the Bill was adopted by the Lok Sabha with a formal amendment replacing the word "Seventy-eighth" by the word "Seventy-first". The Bill, as passed by the Lok Sabha, was considered and passed by the Rajya Sabha on 20 August 1992. The bill received assent from then President Shankar Dayal Sharma on 31 August 1992, and came into force on the same date. It was notified in The Gazette of India on 1 September 1992.

See also
List of amendments of the Constitution of India

References

71
1992 in India
1992 in law
Languages of India
Rao administration
Konkani
Meitei language
Nepali language